Ice (often stylized as ICE) is an industrial music band formed by guitarist Justin Broadrick and saxophonist/vocalist Kevin Martin.

History
Keeping to a similar vein as their other musical project Techno Animal, Justin Broadrick and  Kevin Martin opted for Ice to be a studio-based project. Drummer John Jobaggy, bassist Dave Cochrane and saxophonist/engineer Alex Buess were recruited to aid them in the recording process. Their debut album, Under the Skin, is comparable to Pure-era Godflesh and Martin's free jazz and dub work with God. The group went on hiatus for several years and Jobaggy was replaced by Laika drummer Lou Ciccotelli. By their second album, Bad Blood, the band had absorbed hip hop influences and nearly all the songs featured contributions from recognizable names in the underground rap scene. Blixa Bargeld, of Einsturzende Neubauten, also contributed his vocals to the music.

Band members

Final line-up
 Justin Broadrick – guitar (1993–1998)
 Lou Ciccotelli – drums (1998)
 Dave Cochrane – bass guitar (1993–1998)
 Kevin Martin – vocals, saxophone, synthesizer, turntables (1993–1998)

Former members
 John Jobaggy – drums (1993)
 Alex Buess – saxophone (1993)

Discography
Albums
Under the Skin (Pathological, 1993)
Bad Blood (In Bloom/Reprise/Warner Bros. Records, 1998)

Singles & EPs
Quarantine (Carcrashh, 1995)
Bad Blood Transfusion (with Underdog) (Morpheus, 1998)
Headwreck (Morpheus, 1998)
Trapped in Three Dimensions (Morpheus, 1999)

References

1993 establishments in England
Alternative hip hop groups
British industrial music groups
British experimental musical groups
Musical groups established in 1993
Musical groups disestablished in 1998
Dub musical groups
Noise musical groups